The Lightning project, announced on December 22, 2004, and   developed by the Mozilla Foundation, produces an extension that adds calendar and scheduling functionality to the Mozilla Thunderbird mail and newsgroup client and SeaMonkey internet suite. Lightning is an iCalendar compatible calendar.

Unlike the discontinued Mozilla Sunbird and Mozilla Calendar extension, Lightning integrates tightly with Thunderbird.

Lightning is available in 32-bit and 64-bit versions for Windows, macOS and Linux, and is installed by default on Thunderbird.

History 
Version 0.9 was the last planned release for Thunderbird 2. A calendar was originally to be fully integrated into Thunderbird 3, but those plans were changed due to concerns with the product's maturity and level of support. Lightning 1.0b2 is compatible with Thunderbird 3.1, Lightning 1.0b5 is compatible with Thunderbird 5 and 6, and Lightning 1.0b7 is compatible with Thunderbird 7. Lightning 1.0 was released to the public on November 7, 2011. It was released alongside Thunderbird 8.0. Following that, every Thunderbird release has been accompanied by a compatible Lightning point release. Lightning finally started shipping with Thunderbird with version 4.0. As of 21 October, 2018, Lightning 5.4 is incompatible with the latest release of Thunderbird 60.2.1.

Sun Microsystems contributed significantly to the Lightning Project to provide users with an alternative free and open-source choice to Microsoft Office by combining OpenOffice.org and Thunderbird with the Lightning Extension. In addition to general bug-fixing, Sun focused on calendar views, team/collaboration features and support for the Sun Java System Calendar Server.

See also

 List of personal information managers

References

External links

 Mozilla Thunderbird - Lightning Calendar — Mozilla
 Lightning :: Add-ons for Thunderbird or SeaMonkey - Mozilla Add-ons
 Provider for Google Calendar :: Add-ons for Thunderbird or SeaMonkey (Requires Lightning) - Mozilla Add-ons
  Mozilla Calendar Blog
 The Rumbling Edge

Discontinued Thunderbird WebExtensions
Mozilla Thunderbird
Free calendaring software
Free personal information managers
Free software programmed in C++
Software that uses XUL